Strausberg is the main railway station for the city of Strausberg in Brandenburg. It is served by the S-Bahn line .

Overview
The station is part of the Prussian Eastern line Berlin-Gorzów and is the southern end of the Strausberg–Strausberg Nord line.

There is also a station for the Strausberg Railway as well as Regional trains from Berlin Lichtenberg to Kostrzyn.

Every second  train terminates at Strausberg.

See also
Strausberg Railway
Straussee Ferry
Strausberg Hegermühle station
Strausberg Stadt station
Strausberg Nord station

References

External links

Strausberg
Transport in Strausberg
Berlin S-Bahn stations
Railway stations in Brandenburg
Buildings and structures in Märkisch-Oderland
Railway stations in Germany opened in 1867